Tahoua is a city in Niger and the administrative centre of the Department of Tahoua and the larger Tahoua Region. It is the fourth largest town in the country, with a population of 117,826 (2012 Census).

Overview
The city is primarily a market town for the surrounding agricultural area. It serves as an entrepot for Tuareg merchants from the north and Fulani traders from the south. The town is noted for its production of tchoukou cheese.

It is divided into a pair of urban municipalities: Tahoua I and Tahoua II. The town itself is divided into an old town area, and the Sabon Gari ('new town') area to the north.

History
Tahoua began as a pair of small villages called Bilbis and Fakoua, and began growing from the 17th century on as various groups began migrating to the area, such as the Fulani and Tuareg. Various animist (or Azna) peoples began fleeing to the area to escape persecution from Muslim rulers further north.

Demographics  
Tahoua city is mainly dominated by Fulanis ethnic group.

Transport
Tahoua is served by the Tahoua Airport.

Notes

References

Populated places in Niger
Tuareg
Tahoua Region